Clayton Byron Simmons (October 11, 1876 – July 24, 1922) was an American osteopath and college football and college basketball coach. He served as the head football coach Iowa State Normal School—renamed Iowa State Teachers College in 1909 and now known a s University of Northern Iowa—in Cedar Falls, Iowa from  1908 to 1909 and at the First District Normal School—commonly known then as Kirksville Normal now known as Truman State University—in Kirksville, Missouri from 1910 to 1911, compiling a career college football coaching record of 14–9. Simmons was also the head basketball coach at Iowa State Teachers for one season, in 1909–10, tallying a mark of 4–3.

Simmons was a 1904 graduate of Colgate University. He was also a graduate of the Kansas City School of Medicine and the American School of Osteopathy. Simmons was born in Oil City, Pennsylvania. He died on July 24, 1922, in Excelsior Springs, Missouri.

Head coaching record

Football

References

External links
 

1876 births
1922 deaths
American osteopaths
Northern Iowa Panthers football coaches
Northern Iowa Panthers men's basketball coaches
Truman Bulldogs football coaches
A. T. Still University alumni
Colgate University alumni
University of Missouri–Kansas City alumni
Basketball coaches from Pennsylvania